Anita Thompson Dickinson Reynolds (1901–1980) was an African American model, dancer, and actress. She was one of the first African-American stars of silent film.

Life
Anita Thompson was born in Chicago, Illinois, on March 28, 1901, into a politically engaged middle-class African-American family. She grew up in Los Angeles, California where her mother Beatrice Thompson was active in the NAACP including as chapter President. Her father was Samuel Thompson a Pullman Porter and jewelry wholesale agent. Her uncle was Noah Thompson whose wife was Eloise Bibb Thompson. She trained as a dancer and performed with Rudolph Valentino. Langston Hughes was a cousin; guests at the family home in Los Angeles included Booker T. Washington, A. Philip Randolph and W. E. B. Du Bois.

Career
 
Reynolds is considered one of the first Black stars of silent film. In early-1920s Hollywood, she studied dance with Ruth St. Denis, played an Arab servant girl in The Thief of Bagdad and starred in one of the earliest Black-produced films, By Right of Birth, in 1921, about a Black girl whose adoptive white parents conceal her racial origins.

Moving on from acting, Reynolds circulated international artistic circles and in the fashion scene, finding a career in modeling. In the early 30s she was involved with Claude McKay and lived with him for a time in a village outside Tangiers.  In the 1930s, she modeled clothes for the famous French designer Coco Chanel.

Personal life
 
She worked as a nurse in France between the wars and left immediately after the Nazi occupation. Upon her return to the United States, she studied to be a psychologist. Reynolds was also a teacher and art instructor. Her memoirs “American Cocktail: A ‘Colored Girl’ in the World” were published by Harvard University Press in January 2014, based on notes in interviews by Howard Miller and edited by Cornell University professor George B. Hutchinson. She was married first in France and Morocco to a White Englishman Dwight Lloyd Dickinson. She was then married later in her life in St. Croix, United States Virgin Islands, to a white American, Guy Oliver Reynolds.

"Passing" in Hollywood
Reynolds racially ambiguous appearance enabled her to navigate 1920s-1940s Hollywood more easily than her darker-skinned counterparts. However, like Fredi Washington⁠—another white-passing Black actress—Reynolds never actively denied her racial identity, but allowed lovers and others to see her variously as American Indian, East Indian, "high yaller", "wild baby", "part Cherokee", "brown-skinned", "yellow peril" or "sugar cane". She called herself an "American Cocktail".

Reynolds traveled easily between the mostly white bohemia of Greenwich Village and the clubs and salons of Harlem, seemingly meeting everyone who was anyone. She was able to move on to Paris and then to the expatriate colony in Morocco, along the way collecting lovers, several aborted writing projects and a torrent of acquaintances with droppable names, including James Joyce, Ernest Hemingway, Claude McKay, Paul Bowles, Gertrude Stein, E. E. Cummings, Picasso and Coco Chanel.

Most of my contemporaries, both black and white, have had chiefly tales of woe tell. I feel a little guilty saying how much fun I have had being a colored girl in the twentieth century.

Reynolds died in 1980 in St. Croix.

References

External links

 Anita Thompson in Harlem World Magazine

1901 births
1980 deaths
African-American female models
American female models
American silent film actresses
African-American models
20th-century American memoirists
American women memoirists
Actresses from Los Angeles
African-American actresses
American film actresses
African-American female dancers
American female dancers
Dancers from California
African-American dancers
20th-century American actresses
20th-century American women writers
20th-century American dancers
20th-century African-American women writers
20th-century African-American writers